Las Vegas Sands Corporation is an American casino and resort company with corporate headquarters in Paradise, Nevada, United States. Its corporate mission is to create "Integrated Resorts" which feature a combination of gambling, accommodation, retail, and meeting space.

The company holds several resorts in Asia, including the Marina Bay Sands in Singapore, which opened in 2010. Through its majority-owned subsidiary Sands China, the company owns several properties in Macau, including the Sands Macao, The Londoner Macao, The Venetian Macao, The Plaza Macao, and The Parisian Macao. As of 2020, it is the third-largest casino company worldwide by revenue.

History

Development on the Las Vegas Strip
Entrepreneur Sheldon Adelson and his partners Richard Katzeff, Irwin Chafetz, Ted Cutler, and Jordan Shapiro bought the Sands Hotel and Casino in 1989.  Adelson and his partners financed their venture with investments in personal computers and trade shows, founding the computer trade show COMDEX in 1979. They opened the 1.2 million square foot Sands Expo and Convention Center, then the largest privately owned convention facility in the world, across from the hotel in 1990.

The Sands Hotel was unable to compete with newer resorts on the Las Vegas Strip and was demolished to make room for The Venetian. Construction of the Venetian began in 1997, funded by Adelson's sale of COMDEX. Modeled on Venice, Italy, it joined the ranks of themed hotels such as Excalibur, New York-New York, and Paris Las Vegas on the Las Vegas Strip. In 2004, Las Vegas Sands, Inc. went public, and its name was changed to the Las Vegas Sands Corporation.

Construction on The Palazzo began in 2005.The Palazzo and The Venetian make up the world's largest hotel under one roof, at 7,000 all-suite rooms and 17 million square feet. The 43-story unfinished condominium skyscraper St. Regis Residences at the Venetian Palazzo is on the same campus. Construction halted in 2008 due to company financial issues.

The 2008 financial crisis forced Adelson to invest $1 billion of his own capital to keep the Las Vegas Sands in business, much of which the company spent developing event spaces and high-end retail stores in their properties By 2011, the Las Vegas Sands Corporation's main profits came from renting convention space.

Expansion into Asia

The Corporation soon recognized new commercial opportunities in Asia, specifically in Macau, the only Special Administrative Region of China where gambling is legal. Las Vegas Sands Corporation, along with Wynn Resorts and Galaxy Entertainment Group, was one of the first to be granted a casino operating concession. The Sands Macao resort, Macau's first American-operated casino, opened in 2004.

Las Vegas Sands Corporation's future Macau properties were largely in Cotai, a district of reclaimed land created through public works projects and designated for hotels and casinos. The Venetian Macao, the second-largest in the world at 550,000 square feet, opened in 2007.

In 2008, Las Vegas Sands opened a Four Seasons hotel next to the Venetian Macao. It was followed by The Londoner Macao, originally branded Sands Cotai Central, and The Parisian Macao.

Development plans proceeded in 2010 for Marina Bay Sands resort in Singapore, at $5.6 billion the most expensive hotel and casino ever built.  The resort was designed by Israeli-Canadian architect Moshe Safdie and is composed of three 57-story towers connected at the top by a 3-acre Skypark. The integrated resort was the second built in Singapore after Resorts World Sentosa. Eight months after opening, Marina Bay Sands set a record for posting a $600 million operating profit.

Recent history
In September 2012, the Las Vegas Sands Corporation announced that Madrid had been chosen as destination for a casino resort project dubbed EuroVegas. In February 2013, the Corporation named the town of Alcorcón, on the outskirts of Madrid, as the site for the EuroVegas project. Plans included six casinos, twelve hotels, a convention center, three golf courses, shopping centers, bars, and restaurants, and was expected to take 10 years to build. In December 2013 the EuroVegas project was officially canceled.

In 2015, the Las Vegas Sands Corporation and California-based co-developer California-based Majestic Realty Co. proposed a $1.2 billion 65,000-seat stadium located near UNLV for the Oakland Raiders football team. The proposal required $420 million from private investors and $780 million in public funding, primarily from tourism.

The company's 2018 annual report anticipated "a significant and adverse effect" from the "proliferation of gaming venues, particularly in Southeast Asia."

In May 2019, the Corporation sold Sands Bethlehem to the Poarch Band of Creek Indians of Alabama for $1.3 billion.

Finances 
In March 2021, two months after Sheldon Adelson's death, the Sands Corporation announced the sale of its Las Vegas properties to Vici Properties and its operations to Apollo Global Management. In 2021 the COVID-19 pandemic further negatively impacted the Corporation's finances with a 97.1% decrease in revenue and a second-quarter fiscal loss of $985 million.

As of 2021, the Las Vegas Sands Corporation is headed by CEO Robert Glen Goldstein, and reported a 2020 annual revenue of $3.61 billion.

Political contributions
According to OpenSecrets, Las Vegas Sands donated $52.9 million to Republican candidates as the largest single contributor to federal campaigns during the 2012 election cycle. By comparison, Adelson Drug Clinic was the second-largest solely Republican contributor during the 2012 election cycle with $42.1 million donated. Since 1992, Las Vegas Sands has contributed $70.5 million to federal campaigns; since 1999 the Corporation has spent $5.4 million on lobbying.

Awards and recognition 
Awarded to Sands China:
2020 Guangdong Human Resources Excellence Award: Best Human Resources Team
2020 Greater China Employer Branding Creativity Awards: Best Social Recruitment Program
2021 Total Rewards Innovation Awards: Best Innovation Plan

Awarded to the Marina Bay Sands:
2020 AmCham Cares Awards: Corporate and Societal Excellence
2020 HRD Awards Asia: Employer of Choice
2020 Randstad Employer Brand Awards: Most Attractive Commercial Companies

Awarded to Las Vegas Sands and USA Properties:
2020 Forbes Global 2000 – World’s Best Employers (Las Vegas Sands)
2020 Forbes Best Employers in Nevada (The Venetian Resort Las Vegas)

Initiatives

Las Vegas Sands has their own sustainability initiative roadmap called Sands ECO360, centered on identifying eco-friendly processes surrounding building development, resort management, and events.

One of the Corporation's initiatives encourages resort staff to report possible water- or energy-conservation concerns.

Two buildings in Singapore are LEED certified, and several in Macau have received awards for Energy Saving Activities.

Properties
Las Vegas Sands Corporation owns the Four Seasons Hotel, The Conrad, Sheraton, and the St. Regis at Cotai Strip as part of The Plaza Macao and the Londoner Macao.

Past properties

Ownership and stock

 December 2004: Las Vegas Sands Corporation completed its initial public offering with the ticker LVS on the New York Stock Exchange at a price of $29 per share. 6.8% of the Corporation was put on the market.  Adelson maintained 87.9% ownership of the company; management and directors owned the remaining 5.3%. 
 October 2007: the Corporation's market capitalization peaked at $52 billion at $144.56 a share.
 September 2008: Las Vegas Sands' stock plummeted to $36.11, prompting Adelson and his wife, Dr. Miriam Adelson, to invest $475 million in the Corporation through a 6.5% convertible note in 2013. 
 November 2008: The Adelson family again invested $525 million in Las Vegas Sands, with the Corporation raising an additional $1 billion in a secondary offering. The Adelsons also purchased 5.25 million shares of preferred stock as well as warrants to purchase 87.5 million shares of common stock at an exercise price of $6 each.
 March 2009: market capitalization sinks to approximately $1 billion at less than $2 a share due to general market declines and concern for the short-term financial health of the gambling industry.
 November 2009: Las Vegas Sands completed an initial public offering of its subsidiary Sands China Ltd., which owns and operates its Macau properties. The Corporation raised a total of $3.3 billion in equity capital by selling a 29% interest in Sands China Ltd.
 2012: CEO Sheldon Adelson and his family owned approximately 53% of the company.

Aircraft
The Las Vegas Corporation operates private aircraft used primarily for charter transportation of executive directors and VIP guests of its properties. The Las Vegas Sands fleet is leased for charter purposes by Tradenda Capital AG (Lichtenstein), whose portfolio of companies includes Sands Aviation LLC and Interface Aviation LLC, the latter of which handles the personal affairs of the Adelson family. All operational Las Vegas Sands aircraft are based in Las Vegas at Harry Reid International Airport. The fleet includes the following aircraft (as of September 2022):

Alleged anti-bribery violations
In March 2013, the New York Times reported that the Las Vegas Sands Corporation had informed the U.S. Securities and Exchange Commission that the Corporation likely violated federal law against the bribery of foreign officials. The Company disputed these reports, stating in a press release:The company did not report any violations of the anti-bribery provisions of the FCPA, and it said news reports stating otherwise, such as the headline in today's New York Times which described the matter by saying 'Casino Says it Likely Cheated,' are both inflammatory and defamatory...in [the Company's] preliminary findings the company's Audit Committee had advised that there were 'likely violations' of the books and records and internal controls provisions (i.e. 'accounting provisions') of the FCPA. A potential violation of the accounting provisions could range anywhere from a single transaction recorded incorrectly to other errors in the accounting records. The company said it will vigorously defend itself against that type of uninformed and misleading reporting.

Legal issues
On May 31, 2016, Sands reached a financial settlement with former Sands China president Steve Jacobs, who sued the company in 2010 for breach of contract and wrongful termination. Terms of the settlement were not disclosed, but the Wall Street Journal reported that the company paid Jacobs more than $75 million. Jacobs had claimed he was dismissed for "blowing the whistle on improprieties" in Macau, including Jacobs’ allegations that Adelson had instructed him to investigate senior Macau officials' potentially damaging financial and business information to use as leverage in future regulatory discussions. Adelson denied these allegations, characterizing Jacobs as a disgruntled ex-employee.

On March 14, 2019, Sands reached a financial settlement with Hong Kong businessman Richard Suen for an undisclosed amount after having sued Las Vegas Sands for the third time, arguing he was owed $347 million by the Company, who countered with $3.76 million. Terms of the settlement were not disclosed, but Sands attorney Richard Sauber said the parties had reached an "amicable settlement and resolution." Suen had successfully sued Sands twice in 2004 with the claim that he had been promised a $5 million success fee and 2% of Sands' profits from its operations in Macau in exchange for helping to obtain a Macau casino concession. The trials resulted in awards of $44 million and $70 million, respectively.

In June 2021, the Company was sued in a Macau court by Asian American Entertainment Corporation, who alleged entitlement to $70 million in Las Vegas Sands' profits in Macau as the company began operating there in 2002.

Prior to the November 2022 elections, Las Vegas Sands conducted a petition drive in Florida, spending $49.5 million to amend the State's Constitution to expand casino gambling. The state of Florida is investigating evidence of potentially fraudulent signatures collected during this event.

See also

References

External links

Gambling companies of the United States
Hospitality companies of the United States
Companies based in Paradise, Nevada
Hospitality companies established in 1988
Gambling companies established in 1988
American companies established in 1988
1988 establishments in Nevada
Companies listed on the New York Stock Exchange
2004 initial public offerings
Sheldon Adelson